is a Japanese animator and director. He is best known for working as director on the Studio Ghibli film The Cat Returns.

History
Morita was born in Fukuoka Prefecture and graduated from Fukuoka Kenritsu Chikushikoto School. During his high school days, he produced an independent animated film called , which won a prize in an animation magazine contest at the time. One of the production staff members for the film was Katsuyuki Toda, who later became a manga artist.

After graduating from the Department of Mechanical Engineering, Faculty of Engineering at Fukuoka University, he joined the animation production company Shaft. His first work as an animator was Hiatari Ryōkō!. Afterwards, he became a freelancer and worked as an inbetweener on movies such as Akira and Kiki's Delivery Service, a key animator for Roujin Z, Hashire Melos!, Memories, Perfect Blue and many others, and an episode director for the OVA Golden Boy. Being an animator who cares about fundamentals, Morita even danced the choreography for the idols in Perfect Blue.

Other Studio Ghibli productions he has worked on include My Neighbors the Yamadas and Koro no Daisanpo, a short film for the Ghibli Museum. This led to him being selected to direct The Cat Returns. In 2007, he directed his first TV series, Bokurano: Ours.

On February 27, 2011, he was elected as director for the Japanese Animation Creators Association. He retired in June 2015 after serving on the board of directors for approximately four years.

Until mid-2017, he worked at Polygon Pictures, a digital animation production company, and was involved in the management of ACTF, a forum themed around digital animation. He is currently working as a freelancer.

Controversy
During the production of the anime adaptation of Bokurano, Morita posted progress reports and held Q&A sessions about the aired episodes on his blog. There were various comments from the viewers such as criticism, support and inquiries. On the same blog, Morita stated, "I dislike the original work, and I admit that I made some malicious changes to the original when making it into an animation." In response to this, not only did viewers criticize the adaptation of Bokurano, but many also criticized Morita himself.

Later, Morita explained, "The word 'dislike' that I used towards the original work was misleading so I'll correct myself. The original manga is good and full of mysteries, and I think it was worth adapting. I wrote that I 'disliked' the original story simply because there was so much mystery there, and because of the hardships involved. I was wrong to easily blame my personal 'dislike' and 'malice' for the criticisms written about the quality of my work. There is no escaping the fact that we have our own interpretation of the greatest mystery of all: why do the children die."

In a Monthly Ikki magazine interview with the original author Mohiro Kitoh, Morita said, "I was half-forced to say [that I 'dislike' it]," to which Kitoh replied, "I'm sure you were (laughs)" and "On the contrary, you've shown some good stuff (laughs)."

Filmography

TV Anime
Hiatari Ryōkō! (1987) - in-between animation
Lupin III: Bye Bye Liberty Crisis (1989) - key animation
Famous Dog Lassie (1996) - key animation
Rurouni Kenshin (1996-1998) - opening key animation
The Adventures of Mini-Goddess (1998) - storyboard
Master Keaton (1998) - key animation
Texhnolyze (2003) - key animation
Planetes (2004) - key animation
Paranoia Agent (2004) - key animation
Koi Kaze (2004) - storyboard
Uninhabited Planet Survive! (2004) - storyboard
Monster (2004-2005) - storyboard, key animation
Noein: To Your Other Self (2006) - storyboard
Witchblade (2006) - storyboard
Bokurano: Ours (2007) - director, storyboard, episode director, key animation
Dennō Coil (2007) - key animation
Himitsu – Top Secret (2008) - storyboard, opening key animation
Black Butler (2009) - storyboard
Birdy the Mighty (2009) - storyboard
Valkyria Chronicles (2009) - storyboard
Umineko When They Cry (2009) - storyboard
Transformers: Animated (season 3) (2009) - storyboard
Anohana: The Flower We Saw That Day (2011) - storyboard
Bunny Drop (2011) - storyboard
Working!! (2011) - storyboard
Inu × Boku SS (2012) - storyboard
Episode of Luffy: Adventure on Hand Island (2012) - director, storyboard, unit director (with Mitsuru Hongō)
Knights of Sidonia (2014) - storyboard
Knights of Sidonia: Battle for Planet Nine (2015) - storyboard
Ajin: Demi-Human (2016) - storyboard
The Reflection (2017) - storyboard
Just Because! (2017) - storyboard
Attack on Titan (2018) - storyboard
Gleipnir (2020) - storyboard

OVA
Record of Lodoss War (1990) - key animation
JoJo's Bizarre Adventure (1993-1994) - key animation
Golden Boy (1995-1996) - storyboard, episode director

Film
Akira (1988) - in-between animation
Kiki's Delivery Service (1989) - in-between animation
Roujin Z (1991) - key animation
Hashire Melos! (1992) - key animation
Memories (1995) - key animation
Perfect Blue (1998) - key animation
Spriggan (1998) - key animation
My Neighbors the Yamadas (1999) - key animation
Tenchi Forever! The Movie (1999) - storyboard, unit director, key animation
Koro no Daisanpo (2002) - key animation
The Cat Returns (2002) - director
Ghost in the Shell 2: Innocence (2004) - key animation
Keroro Gunsō the Super Movie (2006) - key animation
Tales from Earthsea (2006) - key animation
Doraemon: Nobita's Great Battle of the Mermaid King (2010) - key animation
Doraemon: Nobita and the New Steel Troops—Winged Angels (2011) - key animation
One Piece 3D: Mugiwara Chase (2011) - storyboard cooperation
Fullmetal Alchemist: The Sacred Star of Milos (2011) - key animation
Doraemon: Nobita and the Island of Miracles—Animal Adventure (2011) - key animation
A Letter to Momo (2012) - key animation
The Tale of the Princess Kaguya (2013) - key animation
Hakuoki: Warrior Spirit of the Blue Sky (2014) - key animation
Knights of Sidonia (2015) - storyboard production
Ajin: Demi-Human (2015) - storyboard
Godzilla: Planet of the Monsters (2017) - assistant director, storyboard
Godzilla: City on the Edge of Battle (2018) - assistant director, storyboard
Pokémon the Movie: The Power of Us (2018) - storyboard
NiNoKuni (2019) - assistant director, unit director

References

External links

Hiroyuki Morita's Blog

1964 births
Living people
Anime directors
Japanese animated film directors
Japanese animators
People from Fukuoka Prefecture
Studio Ghibli people